Paphinia vermiculifera is a species of orchid found in 2003. It is endemic to Panama.

Taxonomy 
The classification of this orchid species was published by Gunter Gerlach & Robert Louis Dressler; Stanhopeinae Mesoamericanae I in Laneksteriana, 8:23-30. 2003. Paphinia vermiculifera is found in Panama.

The original holotype was found in Coclé, El Valle de Antón. The plant flowered in cultivation on July 6, 2002. The holotype is kept at Missouri Botanical Garden.

References 

vermiculifera
Endemic flora of Panama
Orchids of Panama